Deontrey N. Hill (born January 23, 2000) is an American football center for the Cincinnati Bengals of the National Football League (NFL). He was selected with the 190th pick of the 2021 NFL Draft. He played college football at Georgia.

College career

Hill was ranked as a fourstar recruit by 247Sports.com coming out of high school. He committed to Georgia on December 11, 2017.  Hill started all 14 games of his freshman and sophomore seasons and made the All-SEC 2nd team as a sophomore.  Hill started in the first 8 games of his Junior season before missing the last three with a knee injury.  On January 4, 2021, he announced he would leave the school for the NFL draft.

Professional career

Hill was drafted by the Cincinnati Bengals in the sixth round with the 190th overall pick of the 2021 NFL Draft on May 1, 2021. He signed his four-year rookie contract with Cincinnati on May 17. He appeared in 13 games, of which he started three, as a rookie. He appeared in 11 games in the 2022 season in a special teams role.

References

External links
Cincinnati Bengals bio
Georgia Bulldogs bio

2000 births
Living people
People from Warner Robins, Georgia
Players of American football from Georgia (U.S. state)
American football offensive linemen
Georgia Bulldogs football players
Cincinnati Bengals players